Twenty Mile Creek is a stream in the U.S. state of Georgia. It is a tributary to the Seventeen Mile River.

Twenty Mile Creek received its locational name in the 1810s.

References

Rivers of Georgia (U.S. state)
Rivers of Coffee County, Georgia